"Music and Lights" is a single by British trio Imagination, released in 1982 by R&B Records. It was composed by the band's members in a collaboration with Jolley & Swain. The song has appeared on their second album titled In the Heat of the Night. "Music and Lights" became a hit that reached number five on the UK Singles Chart in 1982. It also reached number one in France and Italy.

Track listing
7" Single
"Music and Lights" – 3:46
"Music and Lights" (Instrumental) – 3:15

12" Single
"Music and Lights" – 5:22
"Music and Lights" (Instrumental) – 4:10

Chart performance

Weekly charts

Year-end charts

Certifications and sales

See also
List of number-one hits of 1982 (Italy)
List of number-one singles of 1982 (France)

References

1982 singles
1982 songs
Imagination (band) songs
Number-one singles in France
Number-one singles in Italy
Songs written by Ashley Ingram
Songs written by Steve Jolley (songwriter)
Songs written by Tony Swain (musician)
Song recordings produced by Jolley & Swain